Nenad Vukanić (born 16 May 1974 in Kotor) is a water polo player who played for FR Yugoslavia at the 2000 Summer Olympics.

See also
 List of Olympic medalists in water polo (men)
 List of World Aquatics Championships medalists in water polo

References
Serbian Olympic Committee

External links
 

1974 births
Living people
People from Kotor
Yugoslav male water polo players
Serbia and Montenegro male water polo players
Montenegrin male water polo players
Olympic water polo players of Yugoslavia
Water polo players at the 2000 Summer Olympics
Olympic bronze medalists for Federal Republic of Yugoslavia
Olympic medalists in water polo
Medalists at the 2000 Summer Olympics
Mediterranean Games medalists in water polo
Mediterranean Games gold medalists for Yugoslavia
Competitors at the 1997 Mediterranean Games